The Bohol Sea, also called the Mindanao Sea, is a sea located between the Visayas and Mindanao islands in the Philippines. It lies south of Bohol and Leyte and north of Mindanao. Siquijor and Camiguin are its two major islands. 

The major cities along the coastline of the sea are Cagayan de Oro, Iligan, Butuan, Dumaguete, Ozamiz and Tagbilaran.

The sea connects to the Philippine Sea through the Surigao Strait, to the Camotes Sea both through the Canigao Channel and Cebu Strait, and to the Sulu Sea through the strait between Negros Island and Zamboanga Peninsula.

Scuba diving
The Bohol Sea is home to a large variety of premier scuba diving locations, dive charter boats, and hotels that cater to divers. Water temperatures are very warm and most divers use a 3/2 short wetsuit to dive the location.

Sea life is abundant and includes clownfish, lionfish, barracuda, dolphins, huge coral formations, and other common tropical sea life. Rorquals, including blue whales, have returned to the Bohol Sea, which is a rare trend in any Asian waters.

References

External links

 
Seas of the Philippines
Marginal seas of the Pacific Ocean
Geography of Mindanao
Geography of the Visayas
Maritime Southeast Asia
Underwater diving sites in the Philippines